Nirmala College for Women is an autonomous institution in Coimbatore, Tamil Nadu, India. It is re-accredited by NAAC with "A" Grade. The college admits undergraduates and post-graduates and offers degrees in the liberal arts, sciences and commerce. The institution was affiliated with Madras University till 1981 and thereafter affiliated with the Bharathiar University.

History
Nirmala College for Women, Red Fields, Coimbatore is a Catholic Institution of Higher Education for Women, instituted in the year 1948. It is under the direction of the religious society of the Franciscan Sisters of the Presentation of Mary founded by Rev.Fr. Joseph Louis Ravel in the year 1853. The College became autonomous in the year 2007. The Institution continues to be affiliated to Bharathiar University and is free to design its own course of studies and adopt innovative strategies of teaching and evaluation. The University degrees are conferred on the students passing the examinations conducted by the College.

The College had its humble beginning as a Second Grade College in the year 1948. The founder Msgr. Oubagarasamy, D.D., the Bishop of Coimbatore, with a missionary zeal and farsighted vision worked to contribute his might to the tremendous task of developing women's education in free India. He sent a proposal to the University of Madras requesting permission from the Coimbatore Diocese to start a College for women in Coimbatore. Thus Nirmala College came into being on the 1st of July 1948. The College has now emerged as one of the premier institutions of learning, propagating higher values of education and learning, with hopes and dreams to achieve her goal "Knowledge Purifies, Charity Enhances".

In tune with its mission, the College promotes inclusive practices in the delivery of its academic programmes taking into account learning differences and the special needs of the physically differently-abled.

The College in line with its goal imparts value-based education. The curriculum promotes national development by fostering global competencies and facilitating skills to meet the challenges in the recent scenario. The wide range of programmes includes traditional arts, science and contemporary courses.

The system assures the students optimal educational benefits and contributes towards their growth. The prime focus of the Institution is research and this is augmented by significant academic activities in the campus. The College also involves the students in co-curricular and extra-curricular activities to sensitize them to social realities. Thus, they are motivated to be a part of the community in a more meaningful way. Their participation in extension, community and outreach programmes vouch for the Institution's commitment to social responsibility.

Nirmala College for Women has a long tradition of service and concern for the socially and economically marginalized section of the society. The College offers a vibrant environment by creating a platform to develop students' potential.

In recognition of the high academic performance and service, the College was accredited with ‘A’ Grade by NAAC during the academic year 2003-04 and was conferred the autonomous status in the year 2007.

The enhancement and sustenance of quality led to the reaccreditation of the college with ‘A’ Grade in the academic year 2010-2011.

In the year 2015, the college was once again accredited ‘A’ grade by NAAC with a CGPA of 3.62.The college having won ‘A’ grade successively in the three cycles is now eligible for a period of extension of seven years of assessment under NAAC.

The college has been recognized under the Star College Scheme of DBT, Government of India from 2012. The college was upgraded to the star status in 2017. Six science departments are included under the Star College Scheme. DST-FIST at the zero level has been awarded to the college in 2017.

The College has miles to go with its rich tradition to fall back on and as an Institution, an eternity to look forward to.

Other facilities 
 Amenities center
 Canteen
 Central Computing Facility

Academics
The college offers courses at undergraduate and postgraduate levels.

Courses
Several undergraduate and post graduate courses are offered in this college.

Undergraduate

Postgraduate

Research programs
The college offers M.Phil. and Ph.D. in mathematics, history, commerce, literature, botany, and chemistry, both full-time and part-time.

Sports
The students of Nirmala college excel in sports especially in weightlifting.

References

External links
Nirmala College official website

Franciscan universities and colleges
Catholic universities and colleges in India
Women's universities and colleges in Tamil Nadu
Universities and colleges in Coimbatore
Educational institutions established in 1948
1948 establishments in India
Colleges affiliated to Bharathiar University
Academic institutions formerly affiliated with the University of Madras